Joseph Summers (1843–1916) was a musician and composer.

He wrote a number of tunes for Christian hymns among which is Palmyra, a tune which is often associated with the hymn: Thou art the everlasting word.

There is an article here about one who appears to be a different Joseph Summers (1839-1917) whose biography is strangely similar to that of our Joseph Summers recorded at Praise.

References

1843 births
1916 deaths
19th-century English musicians